Ichnea is a genus of checkered beetles in the family Cleridae. There are at least four described species in Ichnea.

Species
These four species belong to the genus Ichnea:
 Ichnea digna Wolcott
 Ichnea elongata Knull, 1939
 Ichnea marginella (Klug, 1842)
 Ichnea opaca (Klug, 1842)

References

Further reading

 

Cleridae
Articles created by Qbugbot